Henning Frenzel (born 3 May 1942 in Geithain) is a German former footballer. Frenzel was active in East Germany, and spent his entire career with Lokomotive Leipzig (in its various guises), where he totalled 420 appearances and 152 goals, respectively the third and fourth best in the DDR-Oberliga. He won 42 caps for East Germany, scoring 19 goals, and was part of the bronze medal-winning side at the 1964 Olympics. After retiring in 1978 he worked as a youth coach. In 2004, at the age of 62, he made a comeback for the now re-established Lokomotive Leipzig, in a Kreisliga-3 (tier 11) match against SV Paunsdorf.

References

1942 births
Living people
German footballers
East German footballers
East Germany international footballers
Association football forwards
Olympic footballers of the United Team of Germany
Olympic bronze medalists for the United Team of Germany
Olympic medalists in football
Footballers at the 1964 Summer Olympics
Medalists at the 1964 Summer Olympics
1. FC Lokomotive Leipzig players
DDR-Oberliga players
People from Leipzig (district)
Footballers from Saxony